Adolescence is a 1966 French short documentary film directed by Marin Karmitz. It was nominated for an Academy Award for Best Documentary Short.

References

External links

1966 films
1966 documentary films
1966 short films
1960s French-language films
French short documentary films
Films directed by Marin Karmitz
1960s short documentary films
Documentary films about adolescence
1960s French films